Mycoalvimia is a genus of fungus in the family Tricholomataceae. It is a monotypic genus, and contains the single species Mycoalvimia theobromicola, found in Brazil.

See also

 List of Tricholomataceae genera

References

Fungi of South America
Tricholomataceae
Monotypic Agaricales genera
Fungi described in 1981
Taxa named by Rolf Singer